Ganti Pedapudi is a village in a Gannavaram mandal in East Godavari district in the state of Andhra Pradesh in India.

Geography
Its average elevation is 7 meters (26 feet).

Gallery

References 

Villages in East Godavari district